is a Japanese light novel series written by Makishima Suzuki and illustrated by Yappen. It began serialization online in 2017 on the user-generated novel publishing website Shōsetsuka ni Narō. It was acquired by Hobby Japan, who published the first light novel volume in August 2018 under their HJ Novels imprint. Seven volumes have been released as of July 2021. A manga adaptation with art by Shimo Aono has been serialized online via Hobby Japan's Comic Fire website since December 2018. Both the light novel and manga have been licensed in North America by J-Novel Club.

Media

Light novels 
Hobby Japan published the first light novel volume in print with illustrations by Yappen in August 2018. As of July 19, 2021, seven volumes have been published. The light novel is licensed in North America by J-Novel Club.

Manga 
The light novel series was adapted into a manga series by Shimo Aono and published by Hobby Japan, with six volumes released as of March 1, 2022. The manga is also licensed by J-Novel Club.

Reception 
Demelza from Anime UK News felt the manga gave a unique twist on common tropes, while also praising the characters. Christopher Farris from Anime News Network praised the characters and artwork, while also feeling the story was largely uneventful and had untapped potential.

References

External Links 
  at Shōsetsuka ni Narō 
  
  
 

2018 Japanese novels
Anime and manga based on light novels
J-Novel Club books
Japanese webcomics
Light novels
Light novels first published online
Hobby Japan manga
Shōnen manga
Shōsetsuka ni Narō
Webcomics in print